The Stennes revolt was a revolt within the Nazi Party in 1930-1931 led by Walter Stennes (1895–1983), the Berlin commandant of the Sturmabteilung (SA), the Nazi's "brownshirt" storm troops. The revolt arose from internal tensions and conflicts within the Nazi Party of Germany, particularly between the party organization headquartered in Munich and Adolf Hitler on the one hand, and the SA and its leadership on the other hand.  There is some evidence that Stennes may have been paid by the government of German chancellor Heinrich Brüning, with the intention of causing conflict within the Nazi movement.

Background
The role and purpose of the SA within Nazism was still unsettled in 1930. Hitler viewed the SA as serving strictly political purposes, a subordinate body whose function was to foster Nazi expansion and development. The SA's proper functions, in Hitler's view, were political ones such as protecting Nazi meetings from disruption by protesters, disrupting meetings of Nazi adversaries, distributing propaganda, recruiting, marching in the streets to propagandize by showing support for the Nazi cause, political campaigning, and brawling with Communists in the streets. He did not advocate the SA's functioning as a military or paramilitary organization.

Many in the SA itself—including the leadership—held a contrary, and more glorious, view of the SA's role. To them, the SA was a nascent military organization: the basis for a future citizen-army on the Napoleonic model, an army which would, ideally, absorb the Reichswehr and displace its outmoded Prussian concepts with "modern" Nazi ideals.

The 1930 elections

The call for elections
Reichstag elections had taken place in 1928 and the next elections were scheduled for 1932.

Unfortunately for the course of German democracy, the Müller government imploded in late March 1930 over the issue of the amount of employer contributions to unemployment insurance.

Its successor, the Brüning government, was unable to obtain a parliamentary majority for its own financial reform bill, which was rejected by the Reichstag on 16 July 1930. Brüning asked Hindenburg to invoke Article 48 (Weimar Constitution) in order to promulgate the bill as an emergency decree. Hindenburg did so and the Reichstag promptly repudiated the bill on 18 July 1930, thereby invalidating the presidential decree under the Constitution. Brüning thereupon asked Hindenburg to dissolve parliament and call for new elections, which were scheduled for 14 September 1930.

SA demands: August 1930

Members of the SA in Berlin, led by Stennes, had for some time been voicing objections to the policies and purposes of the SA, as defined by Hitler. These SA members saw their organization as a revolutionary group, the vanguard of a national-socialist order that would overthrow the hated Republic by force.

Stennes complained that advancement within the SA was improperly based upon cronyism and favoritism rather than upon merit. He objected to the general law-abiding approach that Adolf Hitler had adopted after the Beer Hall Putsch, and he and his men chafed under the Hitlerian order to terminate street attacks upon Communists and Jews. The SA also wanted three secure places on the NSDAP list for the upcoming Reichstag elections. In addition, he complained that the SA members under his command were not being paid sufficiently.

The SA had developed a list of seven demands. On 7 August 1930, Joseph Goebbels, the Gauleiter (Nazi regional leader) of Berlin, met with Stennes and other SA officers in Berlin. Stennes demanded the three ballot slots and threatened a "palace revolution" otherwise, claiming that he would resign and take 80% of Berlin SA (some 15,000 men) with him.

Hitler had already heard the SA demands from Franz Pfeffer von Salomon, the SA's supreme commander; had rejected Pfeffer's demands outright, had told him to "get lost" and had called him a "mutineer." Hitler ignored the Stennes initiative and did not grant Stennes an audience when Stennes came to Munich to try to meet with him. The request for the ballot slots was consistently denied.

On 27 August Stennes threatened Goebbels again: he wanted the three Reichstag seats, more money for the SA and more political power in the movement. Hitler again refused to take it seriously. Pfeffer had resigned by this time, and Hitler assured Goebbels he would send the SA Chief of Staff, Otto Wagener, to fix things in the SA.

Stennes decided that action was needed to make a statement. Accordingly, the Berlin SA refused to provide protection for Goebbels at his Sportpalast speech on 30 August 1930, and his men paraded instead in Wittenbergplatz, demonstrating against Goebbels. Goebbels turned to the SS, who provided the necessary security and protection at the meeting and who were then assigned to protect the Gau office in Berlin.

The SA then stormed the Gau office on the Hedemannstrasse, injuring the SS men and wrecking the premises. Goebbels was shocked at the extent of the damage done and notified Hitler, who left the Wagner Festival at Bayreuth and flew immediately to Berlin.

Hitler talked to Stennes and to groups of SA the next day, urging them to follow his leadership. He redefined the issue in different and simpler terms: Was the SA entirely loyal to Hitler under the Führerprinzip, or not? Then on the following day, he convened a meeting of some 2000 SA and announced he was personally taking over as Supreme Leader of the SA and SS (thus becoming Partei- und Oberster SA-Führer). The SA cheered and were delighted that their leader was finally giving them the recognition they felt they deserved. Hitler also had Stennes read a declaration increasing SA funding. A special levy (20 pfennig) would be made on party dues to pay for it.

The crisis was over for the time being. The SA members, it appeared, did not truly want to fight with Hitler or contest his leadership, but only sought treatment that they considered correct in light of their mission and the overall mission of the NSDAP. However, Hitler's effort would not suffice to remove the underlying structural issue that conditioned the Party-SA relationship: What was the SA's role and, in particular, what would that role be if the party actually succeeded in gaining the political power it sought?

Spring of 1931
Although he had made himself Supreme Commander of the SA, Hitler had no interest in running the SA; organization and administration bored him, and he had neither interest nor aptitude for them. His talents lay in propaganda and oratory. He summoned Ernst Röhm and offered him effective command of the SA, as its Chief of Staff. Röhm returned to Germany from his self-imposed exile in South America and promptly reorganized the SA, removing control of Silesia from Stennes.

Meanwhile, Stennes continued to complain; he noted that the SA in Breslau were not able to turn out for inspection in February 1931 because they lacked footwear. He also complained about Röhm's return to run the SA, objecting to the Chief of Staff's homosexuality.

Even more troubling, the strategy of taking power by force was advocated by Stennes in February articles published in Der Angriff. This was disturbing to the Nazi leadership as it contravened Hitler's strategy of gaining power through constitutional means only and forswearing violence as a means to power. And Hitler had very publicly announced his "reliance on legality only" in the Leipzig trial of three young Reichswehr officers for "treasonous activities" in September 1930. This was in perfect timing for the autumn elections and with an eye towards the attendant propaganda value, and he had sworn on the witness stand and under oath that the party had forsaken violent and illegal means as a path to power.

On 20 February 1931 Hitler issued a decree making the SA subordinate to the party organization at the Gau level. Stennes mildly protested to Röhm by letter, raising also the plight of unemployed SA men. On 26 February, Röhm forbade the SA from taking part in street battles and also forbade its leaders from speaking in public.

On 28 March 1931 Brüning, employing Hindenburg's emergency powers under Article 48, issued an emergency decree requiring all political meetings to be registered and requiring all posters and political handouts to be subject to censorship. The decree also delegated wide powers to Brüning to curb "political excesses." Of course, the SA objected to the decree. Nevertheless, Hitler—whose party had recently achieved an astonishing electoral victory in the September 1930 Reichstag elections and whose "policy of legality" appeared to be paying dividends in the economic misery of the depression—ordered strict compliance. Stennes refused.

Expulsion of Stennes
Stennes rebelled again. The SA once again stormed the party offices in Berlin on the night of March 31-April 1 and took physical control of them. In addition, the SA took over the offices of Goebbels' newspaper, Der Angriff. Pro-Stennes versions of the newspaper appeared on 1 April and 2 April.

Hitler instructed Goebbels to take whatever means were necessary to put down the revolt. This time, the Berlin police were called to expel the SA intruders from the party's offices. Goebbels and Göring purged the SA in Berlin and environs. Since all money for SA was dispensed through the Gau headquarters, it was a simple matter to cut this off and the lack of funding caused the rebellion to collapse. Stennes was expelled from the party.

In an article by Hitler in the Völkischer Beobachter he justified Stennes' expulsion, referring to him as a "salon socialist." Hitler's editorial demanded that all SA men choose between Stennes and Hitler, declaring that the mutinous Stennes was a conspirator against National Socialism.

Hitler demonstrated his confidence in the SS by his replacement of Stennes with an SS man. Stennes had a following among leftist oriented SA in Berlin, Pomerania, Mecklenburg and Silesia. When he left the SA and NSDAP he founded the National Socialist Fighting League of Germany (Nationalsozialistische Kampfbewegung Deutschlands, NSKD) and made connection with Otto Strasser, as well as Hermann Ehrhardt, ex-leader of the defunct Viking League (Bund Wiking). He recruited about 2000 SA men from Berlin and elsewhere along with 2000 Ehrhardt followers, and the leaders protested that the "NSDAP has abandoned the revolutionary course of true national socialism" and will become "just another coalition party."

Aftermath and consequences
Conservative businessmen gained more confidence in Hitler after seeing the repression of the more radical Stennes element and Hitler's attendant adherence to "legality." As Collier notes:

Ironically the Stennes revolt may have assisted the Nazi rise to power, in that more moderate elements in the German right observed Hitler's adherence to his strategy of legality and gained confidence that he was accordingly "law-abiding."

The revolt illustrated Hitler's consistent approach to solving intraparty frictions: resort to the Führerprinzip, rather than address the underlying problems which motivated the tension. Here, those underlying structural problems simply remained dormant for several years, and the inherent tensions between the party and the SA only grew under the able SA leadership of Röhm, whose ambitions certainly were higher than those of Stennes. The real resolution of the Nazi dilemma had to wait until the German Army forced the issue in the summer of 1934, when, with the SA growing restless and Hindenburg on his deathbed, Hitler responded with the murderous Night of the Long Knives. Having left Germany in 1933, Stennes worked as a military adviser to Chiang Kai-shek until 1949, when he returned to Germany.

In popular culture
Stennes (played by Hanno Koffler) and his 1931 revolt are depicted in Season 4 of Babylon Berlin.

References
Notes

Bibliography
 
 
 
 
 
 
 
 
 
 
 
 
 
 
 

1930 in Germany
1931 in Germany
Conflicts in 1931
Sturmabteilung
History of Berlin
1930s in Berlin